The Babaoshan Revolutionary Cemetery is Beijing's main resting place for the highest-ranking revolutionary heroes, high government officials and, in recent years, individuals deemed of major importance due to their contributions to society. In Chinese, Babaoshan literally means "The Eight-Treasure Mountains". The cemetery is located in the Shijingshan District, a municipality located in western Beijing.

History

The Babaoshan Revolutionary Cemetery, with an area of 0.10 square kilometres and located in the western frontiers of Beijing's massive urban sprawl, was first built as a temple in honor of General Gang Bing, a Ming dynasty soldier who castrated himself as an act of obedience for the Yongle Emperor. The emperor designated the area surrounding the temple as the final resting place of concubines and eunuchs. Over time, the Taoist temple became a place for retired eunuchs only, which it remained for five centuries of imperial rule until it was converted to honor the elite of the Chinese Communist Party five decades ago.

The last abbot of the temple was Xin Xiuming (信修明), who was married and had two children. Due to the harsh living conditions of rural China, Xin Xiuming, when he was 19 and against the strong oppositions of his family members, castrated himself and became a eunuch for Puyi.  After the establishment of Republic of China, Xin Xiuming left the Forbidden City and went to live in the Temple of Loyalty to the Nation, and by 1930, he had risen to the top as the abbot of the Taoist temple. Under Abbot Xin's management, the Taoist temple prospered as an agricultural business establishment: 52 Chinese acres of land that the temple owned were farmed by the eunuchs themselves, another 157 Chinese acres of land the temple owned were farmed jointly by eunuchs and tenant farmers, and the remaining 269 Chinese acres of land the temple owned were rented out to be farmed by tenant farmers.  When the communists decided to turn the temple into a cemetery, Abbot Xin Xiuming was able to negotiate with the then deputy mayor of Beijing, Mr. Wu Han a good deal for the eunuchs: the government would pay the full price for all assets of the temple, and pay each eunuch a monthly pension until his death. The abbot also convinced the government to arrange vehicles to help relocate eunuchs to two new locations.  Those older eunuchs were relocated to a Taoist temple for eunuchs at Colored Glazed River (Liulihe), and the rest were located to another Taoist temple for eunuchs at Westward Tilted Street (Xixiejie).

Israel Epstein, a Communist Jew who immigrated to China, was honored and cremated at Babaoshan in 2005.

In January 2010, eight individuals (four UN peacekeepers and four Chinese delegates) who were killed in the 2010 Haiti earthquake were also laid to rest at Babaoshan as martyrs.

On December 5th, 2022, former Chinese president and Paramount Leader from 1989 to 2002 Jiang Zemin was cremated at the crematorium in preparation for his state funeral.

Establishment

After the land was purchased, the legal proceeding followed: Babaoshan Revolutionary Cemetery traces its legal/judicial root to the Temporary Legislation on the Burial at Revolutionary Martyrs Cemetery (革命烈士公墓安葬暂行规定) issued by Beijing Municipal Government in August 1951.  After numerous reviews, the modified version was renamed to Temporary Legislation on Revolutionary Martyrs Cemetery (革命公墓暂行规定) and made into law on Executive order #270 on December 20, 1951.  Babaoshan Revolutionary Cemetery was built according to the regulations described in this law.

One of the most important piece of legislation is the third section, where it dictates the different level of treatment of late cadres at Babaoshan Revolutionary Cemetery, which has since become the standard for the rest of cemeteries in China for decades.

There are three levels for the area and the location of the graves depending on the ranks of the late cadres:

One of the two portions of the 1st District is the region in front of the temple.  This is the region for cadres at county level and regimental officers.  The area of individual grave can not exceed 12 ft (4 m) by 6 ft (2 m).

The other portion of the 1st District is the region to the east of the temple.  This is the region for cadres at prefecture level and divisional officers.  The area of individual grave can not exceed 12 ft (4 m) by 12 ft (4 m).

The 2nd District is located to the west of the temple.  This is the region for cadres at provincial level and army/corps level officers.  Since this category includes several levels of rank, the maximum size of each grave varies: those who held lower ranks can not exceed  square, and those of higher rank can not exceed  square.

The 3rd District is located to the north of the temple, and it is designated those had special place in the revolution, and those served in the central government.  The area of the grave would be determined individually by the government.

The mourning hall with several rooms where cinerary caskets are placed follows a similar rule: room number one has all of the cinerary caskets of deceased cadres / officers qualified to be buried in the graves in the 1st, 2nd, and 3rd Districts, and cinerary caskets of all other deceased would be placed in other rooms.  Arrangement of the cinerary caskets also follows the similar rule: the front wall of room number one is reserved for the cinerary caskets of deceased cadres of the central government, while side walls of room number one are reserved for the deceased cadres who had no positions in the central government, but held ranks enough to have their cinerary caskets to be placed in room number one.  Even for the same wall, there are similar rules for the levels at which the cinerary caskets are placed: the higher the ranks the deceased held, the higher the cinerary casket is placed.

Hearse
For the first few years, there was no hearse for Babaoshan Revolutionary Cemetery; vehicles were temporarily drafted from other governmental establishments or hired from private businesses when needed.  In 1956, three vehicles were assigned to Babaoshan Revolutionary Cemetery: a Polish truck, a World War II Japanese Toyota truck nicknamed "Potato vehicle" by the workers due to its round nose, and an American Jeep towing a trailer in which a body was placed.

In 1962, more than a dozen GAZ-63 trucks were reassigned to Babaoshan Revolutionary Cemetery at once, from the 13th Plant of Passenger Coaches (客车十三厂), but the original three vehicles were not completely retired until the Cultural Revolution had started.  When the Field Marshal Chen Yi died in February 1972, the Chinese government finally realized that trucks acting as hearses was inadequate for special occasions such as funerals of important governmental figures.  An emergency order was given to the 4th Plant of Passenger Coaches (客车四厂) to produce a true hearse, and after consulting with workers at Babaoshan Revolutionary Cemetery, a purpose-built hearse was pressed into service just a few months after the order was given.  The hearse was based on the chassis of the Liberation Truck, and thus also used the same Liberation brand.

Crematorium

From the start, the crematorium used at Babaoshan Revolutionary Cemetery was a Type 82B, a Chinese copy of a 1940s-era Czech crematorium, which could only be operated manually, resulting in very slow preparation times.  Furthermore, it took a huge effort to clean the crematorium.  Whenever a high-ranking official's funeral took place, ordinary citizens had to wait and their original schedules were disrupted, resulting in many complaints from the public.

To solve the problem, in 1984, China imported two new crematoria from a Japanese firm in Tokyo (日本東京博善株式会社); one went to Shenyang, and the other went to Babaoshan.  The Japanese crematorium was highly automated but also could be operated manually when desired. In addition, the pollution generated during cremation was next to nothing.  However, such environmental friendly process came at a price: the cremation process itself took much longer and consumed more fuel.  Nonetheless, due to advantages such as the ease of cleaning and automation, all activities other than the cremation itself were greatly reduced, resulting in much higher efficiency.  The higher efficiency in turn helped to solve the schedule conflicts and reduced complaints.  After two months of installation and testing, the Japanese crematorium formally went into service and replaced the obsolete Type 82B crematorium, and it remains in service until this day, specifically used to cremate high-ranking governmental officials.

Although the Japanese crematorium has been adequate, the ever increasing needs required a new crematorium, and a new domestic crematorium that was fully computerized was added to the inventory.  The new crematorium further improved environmental standards and efficiency, and consumes less fuel in comparison to the Japanese crematorium, while the cremation process was shorter.  This newest addition was produced by Shougang, and is mainly used for common citizens.

Notable people buried at Babaoshan

 Bo Yibo (1908–2007)                                                                                                                                  
Eugene Chen (1878–1944) 
 Chen Yun (1905–1995) 
 Dong Biwu (1886–1975)  
 Israel Epstein (1915–2005)
 Geng Biao (1909–2000)
 George Hatem (aka Ma Haide) (1910–1988)
 Hua Luogeng (1910–1985)
 Lao She (1899–1966)
 Li Fuchun (1900–1975)
 Li Keran (1907–1989)
 Li Peng (1928–2019) 
 Li Rui (1917–2019)
 Li Siguang (1889–1971)
 Li Xiannian (1909–1992)
 Liao Chengzhi (1908–1983)
 Lin Boqu (1886–1960)
 Liu Fuzhi (1917–2013)
 Liu Yazi (1887–1958)
 Lü Zhengcao (1904–2009)
 Luo Ronghuan (1902–1963)
 Luo Ruiqing (1906–1978)
 Hans Müller (1915–1994)
 Ngapoi Cedain Zhoigar (1915–2012)
 Ngapoi Ngawang Jigme (1910–2009)
 Nie Rongzhen (1899–1992)
 Peng Dehuai (1898–1974)
 Peng Zhen (1902–1997)
 Puren (1918–2015)
 Qi Gong (1912–2005)
 Qian Xuesen (1911–2009)
 Qiao Shi (1924–2015)
 Qu Qiubai (1899–1935)
 Manya Reiss (1900–1962)
 Ren Bishi (1904–1950)
 Agnes Smedley (1892–1950)
 Douglas Springhall (1901–1953)
 Anna Louise Strong (1885–1970)
 Tao Zhu (1908–1969)
 Tan Zhenlin (1902–1983)
 Wan Li (1916–2015)
 Wang Dongxing (1916–2015)
 Wang Guangmei (1921–2006)
 Wang Yaowu (1904–1968)
 Wen Yiduo（1899–1946）
 Yao Yilin (1917–1994)
 Yu Qiuli (1914–1999)
 Zaitao (1887–1970)
 Zeng Shan (1899–1972)
 Zhang Aiping (1910–2003)
 Zhang Lan (1872–1955)
 Zhang Wannian (1928–2015)
 Zhou Chunquan (1905–1985)
 Zhu De (1886–1976)
 Hoàng Văn Hoan (1905–1991)
 Chen Shunyao - the wife of former state Councillor Song Ping - buried 2019

In April 1996 the ashes of Emperor Puyi were buried in Eastern Qing Mausoleum near Beijing (清东陵, Qingdongling) until Puyis's wife Li Shuxian insisted on having his ashes transferred to the tomb of Wanrong in Xiling where they remain buried to this day.
Nowadays, only the emperor's brother Prince Pujie (溥杰) lies in Babaoshan Cemetery.

See also
 List of national cemeteries by country
 Wuzhi Mountain Military Cemetery
 Revolutionary Martyrs' Cemetery
 Patriotic Martyrs' Cemetery
 Mausoleum of Mao Zedong

Notes

External links

 Pictures of Babaoshan  during Qingming Festival with short biographies of several of the people interred there.
 Babaoshan Cemetery at Find a Grave

National cemeteries
Cemeteries in Beijing
Shijingshan District